B2W is an online retail company in Latin America, as a result of the merger between Americanas.com and Submarino.com. Lojas Americanas are the controlling shareholder, with about 60% of the new company, while 40% is a free float.

The new company had a market share of about 50% of the online sales industry in Brazil at the time of the merger, and they have plans to expand through multiple distribution channels, aiming to compete with larger companies in traditional retail.

B2W operates through the websites Submarino.com, Americanas.com, Shoptime, Soubarato. In Brazil, B2W has many competitors like Amazon, Cnova, Walmart and Mercado Libre.

In late 2013 B2W launch the Marketplace in Submarino and roll out to Americanas and Shoptime in 2014. In 2017 Marketplace reach more than R$ 4,5 billion.

References

External links
 B2W Digital Home Page
 Americanas.com
 Submarino.com
 Shoptime.com
 Soubarato.com

Companies listed on B3 (stock exchange)
Companies based in Rio de Janeiro (city)
Brazilian brands
Online retailers of Brazil
2006 establishments in Brazil
Retail companies established in 2006